James Allen Joines is an American politician currently serving as the mayor of Winston-Salem, North Carolina. In 2009, he was also appointed chairman of the North Carolina Economic Development Board.

Political career
Joines, a Democrat, was elected mayor of Winston-Salem on November 6, 2001. He defeated Republican incumbent Mayor Jack Cavanagh, Jr. by a wide margin. Before his election, Joines had served as deputy assistant city manager.

Joines had been named as a possible challenger to Congresswoman Virginia Foxx in North Carolina's 5th district in the 2006 election, but declined to enter the race.

In the 2012 North Carolina gubernatorial election, many suggested Joines as a potential candidate in the Democratic primary, but he declined, stating that there was still work he wished to do in Winston-Salem.

In the 2013 election, Joines was challenged by Gardenia Henley in the Democratic primary. His Republican opponent, James Knox, dropped out of the race in August after it was revealed he had used a racial epithet to refer to an elections worker, although his name was still on the ballot. Joines was elected to his fourth term in the general election.

In the 2016 election (Winston-Salem elections had moved to even-numbered years), Joines was easily re-elected, with only a write-in candidate opposing him.

References

External links
Official biography

University of Georgia alumni
Mayors of Winston-Salem, North Carolina
Living people
Appalachian State University alumni
North Carolina Democrats
1947 births
21st-century American politicians